The median center of U.S. population is determined by the United States Census Bureau from the results of each census. The Bureau defines it to be:

As of the 2020 U.S. census, this places roughly 165.7 million Americans living on each side of a longitude line passing through a location in Gibson County, Indiana, and the same number living on each side of a latitude line through the same point.

See also 
 Mean center of the United States population
 Center of population
 Geographic center of the United States
 Geographic center of the contiguous United States

References 

Demographics of the United States
Center of population